The Macchi M.26 was an Italian flying boat fighter prototype of 1924 designed and manufactured by Macchi.

Design and development
In 1924, the Regia Marina (Italian Royal Navy) issued a requirement for a replacement for its Macchi M.7ter flying boat fighter. To compete with the SIAI S.58 for a production order as the replacement, Macchi company designer Mario Castoldi (1888-1968) developed the M.26. It was a wooden, single-seat, single-bay biplane armed with two fixed, forward-firing 7.7-millimeter (0.303-inch) Vickers machine guns.  It had plywood and fabric skinning, and its wings were of equal span and unstaggered. The M.26s engine, a 221-kilowatt (296-brake horsepower) Hispano-Suiza HS 42 V8 driving a pusher propeller, was mounted on struts above the hull and below the upper wing. For an aircraft of its type, its aerodynamic design was very clean.

The M.26 was completed in 1924 and made its first flight that year, demonstrating good performance. Macchi built two prototypes, but the Regia Marina opted to save money by re-engining the Macchi M.7ter to extend its service life rather than purchase a new aircraft, and Macchi received no production orders for the M.26. However, a few years later Macchi based the design of its M.41 fighter on that of the M.26.

Operators

Regia Aeronautica

Specifications

Notes:
Time to 4,000 m (13,123 ft): 12 min 18 sec

See also

Notes

References

Green, William, and Gordon Swanborough. The Complete Book of Fighters: An Illustrated Encyclopedia of Every Fighter Aircraft Built and Flown. New York: SMITHMARK Publishers, 1994. .

M.26
1920s Italian fighter aircraft
Biplanes
Single-engined pusher aircraft
Aircraft first flown in 1924